AI Bridging Cloud Infrastructure (ABCI) is a planned supercomputer being built at the University of Tokyo for use in artificial intelligence, machine learning, and deep learning. It is being built by Japan's National Institute of Advanced Industrial Science and Technology. ABCI is expected to be completed in first quarter 2018 with a planned performance of 130 petaFLOPS. Power consumption is targeting 3 megawatts, and a planned power usage effectiveness of 1.1. If performance meets expectations, ABCI would be the second most powerful supercomputer built, surpassing the current leader Sunway TaihuLight's 93 petaflops. But still behind the Summit (supercomputer).

History

Design
The design of the ABCI is to be focused on low precision floating point, big data, and artificial intelligence applications; rather than Linpack performance.

Projects
The ABCI is planned to be available to Japanese corporations, small businesses, and researchers; reducing their dependence on foreign cloud computing providers such as Microsoft and Google.

References 

Fujitsu supercomputers
GPGPU supercomputers
Petascale computers
Supercomputing in Japan
University of Tokyo
X86 supercomputers